Maldivians in Pakistan are mostly students pursuing degrees and courses across various universities and colleges throughout the country. According to registrations based with the local embassy and Maldivian government records, their numbers are in the hundreds; in addition, some 400-600 students are in the country unregistered. There are an estimated 150 Maldivian students obtaining religious education and instruction in Pakistani Islamic institutions and madrassas. Maldivian diplomats also receive training in Pakistan.

Safety and security
In the afterwake of the 2009 International Islamic University bombing in Islamabad, hundreds of Maldivian students studying in different parts of Pakistan were found fearing for their safety. Among the eight Maldivian students studying at IIU, two of them were present at the university when the bombs went off. A Maldivian student speaking on the occasion remarked that threats against educational institutions had become widespread and she hoped "they won’t target us." Another said: "Actually now we are used to threats like these…..we expect things to go bad but there is nothing that we can do." In light of the instability, the Maldivian government has claimed to have received and taken into account intelligence on the country's security situation and concerns for safety of Maldivian nationals. In November 2009, the Government of Maldives recommended Maldivian students to return amid fears that the war in Pakistan could spread further and pose a danger to the students. In addition, it pledged full cooperation to those who wished to do so.

Notable people
 Ilyas Hussain Ibrahim

References

External links
 Haamadaily.com
 Miadhu.com

Ethnic groups in Pakistan
Pakistan
Pakistan
Maldives–Pakistan relations